Nestorio (Nestório; Ancient Greek: Βάττυν;  and , Nestram or Нѐсрам, Nésram) is a village and a municipality in the Kastoria regional unit of Macedonia, Greece.

Municipality
The municipality Nestorio was formed at the 2011 local government reform by the merger of the following 4 former municipalities, that became municipal units:
Akrites
Arrenes
Gramos
Nestorio

The municipality has an area of 616.072 km2, the municipal unit 336.326 km2.

Subdivisions
The municipal unit of Nestorio is divided into the following communities:
Kypseli
Kotyli
Nestorio
Ptelea

History

According to Greek mythology, Nestor and Orestes, sons of King Agamemnon, fled to the region for fear of retaliation, after the murder of their mother Clytemnestra by Orestes. At the foot of Grammos, Nestor founded Nestorio and Orestes a few mile away Argos Orestiko.

The history of the village begins from the very ancient times, specifically in the 8th century BC, with three times the area of the current village. The inhabitants of the village, which was called "Vattin" (Ancient Greek: Βάττυν), were mainly engaged in agriculture.

From the Neolithic era, there are ancient finds, such as stone tools, archaeological finds of the Argead Dynasty, ancestors of Alexander the Great, such as statues, inscriptions, bronze finds of the time. Tradition also mentions the presence of Alexander the Great in Nestorio, at a young age, for the purpose of education and hard work, in the art of war.

The tradition also says, that from Nestorio, the core of the famous Macedonian phalanx began. Contrary to myth and tradition, the story continues after the Roman conquest of 146 BC.

The mountainous area of Nestorio, with an altitude of 900 m., belongs geographically, from the Hellenistic times, to Upper Macedonia and more specifically to the province of Orestis together with Lyki, Argos Orestiko, Armonia and Keletron. After the battle of Pydna in 167 BC and the collapse of the Hellenistic Kingdom of Macedonia, Orestis maintained the autonomy granted to it after the Second Macedonian War.

In the middle of the 9th century, the area was annexed by Bulgaria and later in 1018 conquered by the Byzantine emperor Basil II. After the Latin occupation of Constantinople in 1204, the area became part of the Despotate of Epirus and in 1259 was annexed to the Empire of Nicaea.

The area was ruled by the Ottoman Empire until the Balkan Wars of 1912-13, in the late 19th and early 20th century as part of Manastir Vilayet. The population of Nestram consisted of an older local Slavic speaking population and a small Aromanian population that originated from the nearby village of Linotopi on the Gramos mountains that were later assimilated by the Slavonic villagers. At the beginning of the twentieth century, in Nestram there were 16 Aromanian speaking families and 455 Slavic speaking families. Nestram had 2,700 inhabitants in the beginning of the 20th century and most of them were Slavophone (Slavic speaking) Orthodox Christians and a few of them Aromanians. In the early 20th century the majority of the inhabitants of Nestram accepted the rule of the Bulgarian Exarchate. According to the statistics of Vasil Kanchov (Macedonia. Ethnography and Statistics) the inhabitants of Nestram in 1900 were Bulgarians. The population during the Turkish occupation exceeded 5200+ inhabitants. 

Nestram, along with the rest of southern Macedonia, was incorporated into Greece in 1913 following the Balkan Wars. The village was known as Nestrami until 1926 when it was renamed as Agios Nestor. In 1928, the village received its current Greek name Nestorion.

In the modern period, the village is Slavic speaking with a Greek orientation. Field work conducted recently showed only a rudimentary competence in Slavic among the village's inhabitants.

Culture
The village holds an annual rock festival in late-July, called 'River Party'. River Party started in 1978. The bands come from the Greek rock scene, especially from Athens and Thessaloniki and with foreign guests, including from the wider region.

Population

Notable people
Georgios Ntoutsis, revolutionary in Macedonian Revolution of 1878
Keraca Visulčeva, artist

References

External links

Official Site of Nestorio 
River Party (in Greek)
Nestorio on GTP Travel Pages

Municipalities of Western Macedonia
Populated places in Kastoria (regional unit)